The Marquess of Salisbury formed a caretaker government in June 1885, upon his appointment as Prime Minister of the United Kingdom by Queen Victoria, succeeding William Ewart Gladstone. His ministry lasted for over seven months.

Cabinet
:

Changes
August 1885The Duke of Richmond becomes Secretary for Scotland. Edward Stanhope succeeds him at the Board of Trade; his successor as Vice-President of the Council is not in the Cabinet.
January 1886
The Lord-Lieutenantship of Ireland goes into commission.
William Henry Smith becomes Chief Secretary for Ireland. Lord Cranbrook succeeds him as Secretary for War while remaining Lord President.

List of ministers

Notes

References

Sources

 
 
 

British ministries
Government
1880s in the United Kingdom
1885 establishments in the United Kingdom
1886 disestablishments in the United Kingdom
Ministries of Queen Victoria
Cabinets established in 1885
Cabinets disestablished in 1886
Caretaker governments